Computer Gamer was a video game magazine published in the United Kingdom by Argus Specialist Publications, covering home gaming from April 1985 to June 1987. It was a colourful relaunch of the failing magazine Games Computing, a more conservative magazine published throughout in monochrome.

Like many similar magazines, it contained sections of news, game reviews, previews, tips, help guides, columnists, reader's letters, and occasionally cover-mounted game demos.

When the magazine was relaunched, it was directly competing with Computer and Video Games but with only a fifth of the 100,000 monthly sales. It battled on for two years but, adding only 6,000 sales, it was eventually closed in 1987.

Although lost in the crowd of titles on the market in the mid-80s, Gamer did achieve the distinction of having an issue banned by W H Smith and other UK newsagents. The cover promoted a game called "Blood And Guts" but was considered to be too gory and was replaced by a plainer rush cover. The offending image, constructed from pink hessian, bubblewrap, red paint and a Turkish knife, was demoted to background art on the review pages - without complaint.

External links
Archived Computer Gamer magazines on the Internet Archive

1985 establishments in the United Kingdom
1987 disestablishments in the United Kingdom
Defunct computer magazines published in the United Kingdom
Home computer magazines
Magazines established in 1985
Magazines disestablished in 1987
Monthly magazines published in the United Kingdom
Video game magazines published in the United Kingdom